The 2012 North Texas Mean Green football team represented the University of North Texas in the 2012 NCAA Division I FBS football season. It was led by second-year head coach Dan McCarney and played its home games at Apogee Stadium. It was the Mean Green's 12th and final season as members of the Sun Belt Conference (SBC); the school joined Conference USA on July 1, 2013. The team finished with a record of four wins and eight losses (4–8 overall, 3–5 in the SBC) to finish seventh in the conference.

After the completion of the 2011 season, McCarney focused on continuing the momentum created during the team's last game against the Middle Tennessee Blue Raiders. 25 players signed letters of intent to play for the Mean Green, and the team's spring practice ended with an intrasquad scrimmage. The team announced its schedule in March 2012, which included five opponents that were bowl eligible in 2011. The season opened with a road loss to the LSU Tigers and a home opening win against the Texas Southern Tigers. The team began conference play with a loss to the Troy Trojans. The season reached its zenith when the Mean Green defeated the Louisiana–Lafayette Ragin' Cajuns in a nationally televised game on October 16, but the team only won one of its remaining five games to finish with its eighth straight losing season.

Before the season

Previous season

During the 2011 season, the Mean Green played their home games at the new Apogee Stadium, averaging 18,864 spectators for each of the team's six home games. First year head coach Dan McCarney led the team to a 5–7 record, its best since 2004, finishing the season with a 59–7 victory over the Middle Tennessee Blue Raiders. During the game, senior running back Lance Dunbar became the team's all-time leading rusher.

Recruiting class
25 players signed letters of intent to begin playing for North Texas in 2012.

Spring practice

 Sources:

Spring practice began on March 28 and included 15 practices and an intrasquad scrimmage planned to avoid conflicts with classes. Head Coach Dan McCarney supervised the annual Green and White football game that concluded the spring football schedule on April 21. The 2012 match featured the first and third string members comprising the Green Team and the second and fourth string members comprising the White team.

The White team was given a 20-point lead at the start of the contest; they would be unable to score the rest of the game. Quarterback Derek Thompson threw six passes with four completions for 162 yards in the first half. Wide receivers Ivan Delgado and Brelan Chancellor combined for five catches and three touchdowns. Delgado finished with 2 receptions for 114 yards and 1 touchdown while Chancellor had three receptions for 100 yards and 2 touchdowns. Two rushes by running back Jeremy Brown for 52 and 25 yards gave the Green team the lead in the third quarter, bringing the score to 21–20. Ten minutes later, running back Antoinne Jackson rushed ten yards to increase the lead to 28–20. In the fourth quarter, Chancellor caught a 52-yard reception from quarterback Andrew McNulty. Antoinne Jimmerson ran 30 yards for his second rushing touchdown to make the final score 41–20.

Roster

Schedule
The University of North Texas announced the official football game schedule for 2012 on March 1, 2012. Five of the Mean Green's 12 opponents in 2012 participated in a bowl game the previous season. Sports analyst Phil Steele rated the schedule as the 79th toughest out of 124 Football Bowl Subdivision teams.

Source:

Media
All North Texas football games aired via the Mean Green Radio Network, with George Dunham providing play-by-play action and Hank Dickenson providing analysis. Mean Green Radio Network coverage was carried on KNTU 88.1 FM in Denton and on KHYI 95.3 FM in the Dallas–Fort Worth metroplex. 2012 was the first year KHYI provided Mean Green football coverage. Both stations also streamed live online.

Game summaries

Louisiana State

Sources:

The first game for the Mean Green's season was scheduled against the LSU Tigers football team, who had last played in the 2012 BCS National Championship Game against the 2011 Alabama Crimson Tide football team at the end of the 2011 season, losing 21–0. In the week before the game, concerns over the path and effects of Tropical Storm Isaac forced local officials in Louisiana to consider contingency plans for the game. Although the Tigers were forced to alter their practice schedule leading up to the game, the contest was held as scheduled in Tiger Stadium. The Mean Green's two scoring drives were capped by touchdown passes of 80 and 15 yards from quarterback Derek Thompson to wide receiver Brelan Chancellor. The Tigers' 508 yards of total offense led the team to a 41–14 victory over the Mean Green in the season opener.

Texas Southern

Sources:

For their first home game of the 2012 season, the Mean Green defeated the Texas Southern University Tigers, a member of the Football Championship Subdivision (FCS) Southwestern Athletic Conference (SWAC) 34–7. The Tigers, who finished the 2011 season with a 4–7 record, were limited to 185 yards of total offense, while the Mean Green totaled 497 yards, most of which came from rushing. The game was the first home opening win for the Mean Green since the team defeated the SMU Mustangs football team during the 2006 season.

Kansas State

Sources:

For their next road game, the Mean Green played the Kansas State Wildcats, led by potential Heisman Trophy candidate Collin Klein. The two teams had last met during the 2010 season, when the Wildcats defeated the Mean Green 41–49 in the final game at Fouts Field. This time playing at Bill Snyder Family Football Stadium, the Wildcats were favored to win by 28 points by spread bettors prior to the game. Each team scored two touchdowns by midway through the third quarter, but a blocked extra point attempt after North Texas' second score made the score 14-13. Kansas State answered with three unanswered touchdowns in the third and fourth quarter, bringing the score to 35-13 before North Texas scored its final touchdown with 2:31 left in the game. The final score was 35-13 in favor of the Wildcats. Mean Green quarterback Derek Thompson completed 25 of 28 passes in the game.

Troy

Sources:

For their first conference game of the season, the Mean Green faced the Troy Trojans, whom they had defeated the previous year 38–33. North Texas' defensive squad showed significant improvement, slowing a Troy offense led by Corey Robinson that had averaged over 500 yards a game to only two touchdowns. On offense, however, the team struggled to score points despite moving the ball. The Mean Green gained 422 yards of total offense, but kicker Zach Olen missed three field goals and quarterback Derek Thompson completed only 12 of 28 passes for 238 yards and one touchdown. The loss brought the Mean Green's season record to 1-3.

Florida Atlantic

 Sources:

The Mean Green eked out a victory against first-year head coach Carl Pelini and the Florida Atlantic Owls at FAU Stadium, giving the team a 2-3 record through five games, its best start since the 2005 season. After North Texas gained a 17–0 lead midway through the third quarter, Florida Atlantic scored two straight touchdowns in less than two minutes of game time  to bring the score to 17–14. Midway through the fourth quarter, Mean Green kicker Zach Olen made a 28-yard field goal to bring the score to 20–14. North Texas held on to the lead, which was one point short of the points spread predicted prior to the beginning of the game. The Mean Green gained 56 rushing yards against an Owl defense that had allowed an average of 255 yards per game coming into the contest.

Houston

 Sources:

The Mean Green faced the Cougars for the second time in as many years when they traveled to Houston for their final nonconference game of the season. Although Cougars lost their first game of the season to the Texas State Bobcats, the team's prolific offensive unit had recovered somewhat by the time they played the Louisiana Tech Bulldogs on September 8. In that game, the teams combined for a total of 209 plays, breaking an NCAA FBS record held by the Mean Green and the San Jose State Spartans since 1971. The Cougars scored two touchdowns and a field goal to earn a 17-point lead before the Mean Green scored its first points in the second quarter. Houston running back Charles Sims ran for a career-high 210 yards, and the Cougars won the contest with a score of 44-21.

Louisiana Lafayette

Sources:

The Mean Green's Tuesday evening home game against the Louisiana–Lafayette Ragin' Cajuns began at 8:00 p.m. in Denton. Louisiana scored first, and had gained a 20–6 lead by the middle of the third quarter. After North Texas scored two touchdowns and a field goal, followed by a field goal from the Ragin' Cajuns, the score was tied at 23–23. With 1:54 remaining in the game at their own 22-yard line, North Texas quarterback Derek Thompson threw a screen pass to running back Antoinne Jimmerson, who ran 78 yards for the game-winning touchdown. On the ensuing drive, Ragin' Cajun running back Effrem Reed fumbled the ball, which was recovered by North Texas. The Mean Green ran out the clock to win the contest. The game was televised on ESPN2. The broadcast had an estimated 366,000 viewers, earning a Nielsen rating of 0.3.

Middle Tennessee

Sources:

The Mean Green struggled on both sides of the ball against the Middle Tennessee Blue Raiders. Although the Mean Green gained 432 total yards with a balanced running and passing offense, it did not score any points until running back Antoinne Jimmerson ran two yards for a touchdown in the third quarter. By that time, the Blue Raiders had already scored 31 points, making the game out of reach for the Mean Green. Wide receiver Brelan Chancellor broke a collar bone in the first quarter of the game, and would miss the rest of the season.

Arkansas State

Sources:

South Alabama

Sources:

Louisiana Monroe

Sources:

Western Kentucky

Sources:

References

North Texas
North Texas Mean Green football seasons
North Texas Mean Green football